The Key is the eighth studio album from American country music artist Vince Gill. It was released in 1998 on MCA Nashville. It features the singles "If You Ever Have Forever in Mind," "Kindly Keep It Country," "Don't Come Cryin' to Me" (an uncredited duet with Dawn Sears) and "My Kind of Woman/My Kind of Man." This final track was also included on Patty Loveless's 1999 compilation album, Classics. This was Gill's first No. 1 Country Album.

Track listing
All songs written by Vince Gill except where noted.
"Don't Come Cryin' to Me" (Gill, Reed Nielsen) - 3:06
feat. Dawn Sears
"If You Ever Have Forever in Mind" (Gill, Troy Seals) - 4:38
"I Never Really Knew You" - 2:14
"Kindly Keep It Country" - 3:09
"All Those Years" - 3:57
"I'll Take Texas" - 2:05
"My Kind of Woman/My Kind of Man" - 3:53
duet with Patty Loveless
"There's Not Much Love Here Anymore" - 3:28
"Let Her In" - 3:03
"The Hills of Caroline" - 4:44
"Live to Tell It All" (Gill, Sonya Isaacs) - 3:36
"What They All Call Love" - 3:20
"The Key to Life" - 4:02

Personnel 
Compiled from liner notes.

The band
 Vince Gill – lead vocals, acoustic guitar, electric guitar, mandolin
 Hargus "Pig" Robbins – keyboards, pianos
 Steve Gibson – acoustic guitar, electric guitar
 Randy Scruggs – acoustic guitar
 John Hughey – steel guitar
 Glenn Worf – bass 
 Eddie Bayers – drums
 Stuart Duncan – fiddle
 Larry Franklin – fiddle
 Bergen White – string arrangements and conductor
 Patty Loveless – lead vocals on "My Kind of Woman/My Kind of Man"

Background vocalists
 Bergen White – BGV arrangements 
 Dawn Sears (Track 1)
 Lisa Cochran, Michael Eldred, Jon Mark Ivey, Marabeth Jordan, Lisa Silver and Dennis Wilson (Track 2)
 Sara Evans (Track 3)
 Lee Ann Womack (Track 4)
 Liana Manis and Curtis Young (Track 5)
 Shelby Lynne (Tracks 6 & 8)
 Sonya Isaacs, Billy Thomas and Jeff White (Track 9)
 Alison Krauss, Billy Thomas and Jeff White  (10)
 Sonya Isaacs (Track 11)
 Faith Hill (Track 12)

Production
 Tony Brown – producer 
 Chuck Ainlay – recording, mixing
 Steve Marcantonio – recording
 Tim Coyle – second engineer 
 Steve Crowder – second engineer 
 Chris Davie – second engineer 
 Todd Gunnerson – second engineer 
 Mark Ralston – second engineer 
 Glenn Spinner – second engineer 
 Aaron Swihart – second engineer 
 Denny Purcell – mastering
 Benny Garcia – guitar technician
 Jessie Noble – project coordinator 
 Virginia Team – art direction
 Chuck Ferrara – design 
 Jim McGuire – photography

Charts

Weekly charts

Year-end charts

References

1998 albums
Vince Gill albums
MCA Records albums
Albums produced by Tony Brown (record producer)